In education, narrative evaluation is a form of performance measurement and feedback which can be used as an alternative or supplement to grading.  Narrative evaluations generally consist of several paragraphs of written text about a student's individual performance and course work. The style and form of narrative evaluations vary significantly among the educational institutions using them, and they are sometimes combined with other performance metrics, including letter and number grades and pass/fail designations.

Colleges and universities that use narrative evaluations

 Alverno College 
 Antioch College (Narrative evaluations are provided for most classes in addition to letter grades)
 Antioch University
 Bennington College (Letter grades are available in addition to narrative evaluations upon request on a per course basis)
 Bard College (Students are given both letter grades and written comments via "criteria sheets" given mid-term and end-of-term)
 Biola University (The Torrey Honors Program uses a twice-yearly Don Rags meeting with a professor, called a "mentor," in addition to letter grades.)
 Brown University (Narrative course performance report optionally given in addition to letter grade)
 Burlington College (Students are provided an option for traditional transcripts; school is no longer in operation.)
 California Institute of Integral Studies (School of Undergraduate Studies only, in conjunction with pass/no pass grades; for courses from fall 2003 through summer 2021)
 College of the Atlantic (Allows you to opt out of receiving letter grades)
 College of Creative Studies University of California, Santa Barbara (Performance based on work completed/reflected in units received)
 Dharma Realm Buddhist University (Narrative evaluations are provided for most classes in addition to letter grades)
 The Evergreen State College (Letter/number grades are never used)
 Fairhaven College, Western Washington University
 Goddard College (Letter/number grades are never used)
 Hampshire College (Letter/number grades are never used for Hampshire students unless they are taking a Five College class; students in the Five College interchange can get letter grades when their home institution requires it)
 Johnston Center for Integrative Studies, University of Redlands 
 Marlboro College 
 New College of Florida (Letter/number grades are never used)
 New Saint Andrews College (Short evaluations in addition to a system of Latin letter grades)
 Northeastern University School of Law (School of Law only, letter/number grades are never used)
 Prescott College (Letter grades are available in addition to narrative evaluations upon request on a per course basis)
 Quest University Canada (Narrative course performance report optionally given in addition to letter grade)
 Reed College (Letter grades are available upon request)
 Residential College, University of Michigan (Letter/number grades are assigned by request, evaluations by default)
 St John's College (Known as the Don Rag; letter grades are recorded and available by request)
 Sarah Lawrence College  (Letter grades are provided to student upon request)
 Soka University of America (Narrative evaluations and P/NP grade for up to 5 courses)
 University of California, Santa Cruz (UCSC) (Narrative evaluations are given in addition to letter grades. Recently, narrative evaluations were made optional.) 
 University of Washington: Community, Environment, and Planning (CEP major only, narrative transcripts complement the Pass/Fail on the UW transcript)
 Yale Law School (Letter/number grades are never used)

High schools that use narrative evaluations
 
 The Academy at Charlemont, Charlemont, MA (Narratives in addition to letter grade)
 Conservatory Prep Senior High, Davie, FL (Narratives in addition to letter grade)
 The Cambridge School of Weston (Short narratives in addition to letter grade)
 Lehman Alternative Community School (Grades are never used)
 The Urban School of San Francisco (Extensive narratives; GPA is provided at end of year and trimesterly from 11th grade onward)
 Hamden Hall Country Day School (Short narratives in addition to number grade)
 Francis W. Parker School in Chicago (Narratives in addition to letter grade)
 Oakwood School in San Fernando Valley (Narratives in addition to letter grade)
 Hopkins School (Short narratives in addition to letter/number grade)
 Metropolitan Regional Career & Technical Center ("The Met") in Providence, Rhode Island:  (Narratives are converted to grades for college admissions purposes)
 Wildwood School in Los Angeles:  (Narratives are converted to grades for college admissions purposes)
 The Madeira School (Short narratives in addition to letter grade)
 San Roque High School (now called Garden Street Academy) in Santa Barbara, California (Narratives in addition to letter grade)
 Saint Ann's School, Brooklyn (Grades are never used)
 Pacific Crest Community School in Portland, OR (Grades are never used)
 Pierrepont School in Westport, CT (Grades are never used)
 Jefferson County Open School in Lakewood, Colorado (Letter/number grades are never used)
 School One in Providence, RI (Narrative evaluations used in addition to Pass/Fail marker) 
 Stonesoup School, Crescent City, Florida (Narrative GPA constructed at end of 12th grade)
 Youth Initiative High School:  (Grades are never used)
 Tremont School in Lexington, MA:  (Grades are never used)
 Trinity School at Greenlawn: South Bend, IN  (Narratives in addition to letter grade)
 Trinity School at River Ridge: Twin Cities, MN  (Narratives in addition to letter grade)
 Trinity School at Meadow View: Falls Church, VA  (Narratives in addition to letter grade)
 Sagesse High School: Ain-Saadeh, Lebanon  (Narratives in addition to grade scores)
 Allendale Columbia School in Rochester, New York (Narratives in addition to letter grade)
 Bard High School Early College: 6 locations in the United States, including NYC, Cleveland, Baltimore, Newark, and Washington D.C. (Narratives in addition to letter grade)
 Waring School, Beverly, MA (Grades are never used; written evaluations at midterms, longer written evaluations at ends of semesters)

External links

 History and explanation of narrative evaluation system at Santa Cruz
 The Role of Narrative Evaluations at the University of Redlands

Education in the United States
Student assessment and evaluation
Alternative education